Zello is a tech software company in Austin, Texas, U.S., known for the Zello app, which emulates push-to-talk (PTT) walkie-talkies over cell phone networks.

History
Alexey Gavrilov developed the product originally called Loudtalks which was announced at the TechCrunch 40 Mobile and Communications Conference on September 17, 2007. Zello acquired the Loudtalks technology, rebranded, and moved the development team to Austin. It added apps on June 20, 2012. Bill Moore is the CEO and Gavrilov is CPO. Moore founded and was CEO of TuneIn where Gavrilov and his team created popular TuneIn applications.

Zello made the news in June 2013 when Turkish protesters used it to circumvent government censors. As a result Zello was the top  most downloaded application in Turkey during the first week of June 2013.

In February 2014, it was blocked by CANTV in Venezuela. Zello released workarounds and patches to overcome the blocks to support approximately 600,000 Venezuelans who have downloaded the application to communicate with each other amidst protests. It "has been one of the most downloaded applications in Ukraine and Venezuela."

In July 2017, in Latvia, Zello was the main application which was used by thousands of volunteers and rescuers for communication purposes while looking for Ivan Berladin who went missing.

In August 2017 during relief efforts following Hurricane Harvey in Texas, Zello became a popular method for communications between volunteer rescuers (particularly members of the Cajun Navy) and people stranded by the widespread flooding. The app received over 6 million signups in one week as Florida residents responded to hurricane warnings for Hurricane Irma.

In September 2018, while Hurricane Florence caused unprecedented flooding in the US states of North and South Carolina, rescuers used Zello to request information about the locations of people needing help and on street conditions.

On August 27, 2021, the U.S. House of Representatives select committee investigating the 2021 United States Capitol attack demanded records from Zello (alongside 14 other social media companies) going back to the spring of 2020.

Members of the 2022 Freedom Convoy have almost exclusively used Zello to communicate with other members and supporters.

Products

Zello is a live voice push-to-talk communication platform that turns any smart device into a digital two-way radio that works over Wi-Fi and cell networks anywhere in the world. Purpose-built to connect frontline teams and communities, the push-to-talk walkie-talkie app offers instant voice communication with one or many in unlimited secure, private channels, as well as message replay, emergency alerts, location tracking, dispatch capabilities, and Bluetooth device support. 

Zello users can create channels and give control to other Zello users to become moderators. New York Times' technology columnist David Pogue describes Zello's channels, "Like most of the best applications, Zello lets you create groups so that you can carry on something like a party-line phone call among a handful—or hundreds—of friends or collaborators."

Once a channel is created channels can appear on the "Trending" list and creators can assign additional moderators to keep their created channels safe. Though available for Android, iOS, Windows Phone, and Blackberry, Zello can also be accessed from a Windows PC computer with the Zello for Windows PC.
For other smartphone operating systems (e.g., Sailfish OS) there are Zello-compatible apps provided by third parties.

Zello Work is the paid service of Zello app that allows corporates and users looking for real-time communication over groups and channels. Zello Work is different from Zello but is however owned by the same company.

See also 
 Glide (software)
 Mumble (software)
 Voxer

References

External links 
 Official Website

Companies based in Austin, Texas
Walkie-talkies
Privately held companies based in Texas
Technology companies established in 2011
2011 establishments in Texas
Software companies based in Texas
Software companies of the United States